Derrick Demetrius Coleman (born June 21, 1967) is an American former professional basketball player. Coleman attended Syracuse University and was selected first overall in the 1990 NBA draft by the New Jersey Nets.

Throughout his career, the left-handed Coleman was an effective low post scorer, averaging 16.5 points and 9.3 rebounds. He enjoyed his best years as a member of the New Jersey Nets, where he averaged 19.8 points and 10.6 rebounds per game. When Coleman entered the NBA, he was compared to elite power forwards such as Karl Malone and Charles Barkley, and expected to put up similar numbers, only with the added ability to shoot from three-point range. Instead, his career was overshadowed by numerous injuries. Sports Illustrated once remarked that "Coleman could have been the best power forward ever; instead he played just well enough to ensure his next paycheck."

As of 2007, he was working as a developer and entrepreneur in Detroit. He has also appeared as an occasional studio analyst for NBA TV's "NBA Gametime Live" coverage.

Early life
Coleman was born in Mobile, Alabama, but grew up and attended high school in Detroit.

College Career
Coleman joined the Orangemen in the 1986-87 season and was a prototypical Big East power forward for the Orange. Head coach Jim Boeheim said no player in Syracuse's basketball history had more impact than Coleman.

Coleman was selected to first team All-Big East selection in his sophomore and junior seasons, and as a senior, he was named the Big East Player of the Year. He finished as the NCAA's top modern-day rebounder and the school's career scoring leader.

Coleman's Syracuse jersey #44, was retired on March 5, 2006.

NBA career
Coleman was the first overall pick in the 1990 NBA draft after a successful college career. He had a solid rookie season and won the NBA Rookie of the Year Award in 1991.

Coleman went on to improve during the 1991–92 season, averaging close to 20 points and 10 rebounds a game. The Nets were an up-and-coming team as well, with young players like Coleman, Kenny Anderson, Chris Morris and Mookie Blaylock teaming up with solid veteran players like Sam Bowie, Chris Dudley, Terry Mills and Dražen Petrović. The addition of coach Chuck Daly, who won two NBA championships with the Detroit Pistons as head coach, was enough to get the Nets a winning record and into the playoffs during the 1992–93 season. The 1993–94 season was the peak for Coleman and the Nets during his time with the team. The Nets made it to the playoffs for the third straight season, while Coleman averaged his second straight 20 points, 10 rebounds season and was selected to represent the Nets in the All-Star game along with teammate Kenny Anderson. In 1995, the Nets traded Coleman, Rex Walters, and Sean Higgins to the Philadelphia 76ers for Shawn Bradley, Tim Perry, and Greg Graham.

During a 1995 game featuring Coleman's Nets and rival Karl Malone's Utah Jazz, Coleman controversially referred to Malone as an 'Uncle Tom'.

In 1999, Coleman signed with the Charlotte Hornets. In 2001, he was reacquired by the Philadelphia 76ers in a three-team trade involving the Golden State Warriors, where the Hornets acquired Chris Porter, Robert Traylor, George Lynch, and Jérôme Moïso.

He played for the US national team in the 1994 FIBA World Championship, winning the gold medal.

In 2004, Coleman and Amal McCaskill were traded to the Detroit Pistons for Corliss Williamson. The 2004–05 season would be Coleman's last, as he was cut by the team in January 2005. He was one of nine NBA players that faced suspension for his role in the infamous November 2004 Pacers–Pistons brawl.

Coleman is one of only three players in NBA history to record a five-by-five in a game with at least 20 points and 10 rebounds (the other two being Hakeem Olajuwon and Draymond Green).

Post NBA 

Coleman purchased a home in Franklin Lakes, New Jersey, where he resided until 2010, when he moved to Detroit. After the water crisis  began in Flint, Michigan, Coleman drove 65 miles daily to bring residents clean bottled water and eating utensils, which they did not have access to.

NBA career statistics

Regular season 

|-
| style="text-align:left;"| 
| style="text-align:left;"|New Jersey
| 74 || 68 || 35.2 || .467 || .342 || .731 || 10.3 || 2.2 || 1.0 || 1.3 || 18.4
|-
| style="text-align:left;"| 
| style="text-align:left;"|New Jersey
| 65 || 58 || 34.0 || .504 || .303 || .763 || 9.5 || 3.2 || 0.8 || 1.5 || 19.8
|-
| style="text-align:left;"| 
| style="text-align:left;"|New Jersey
| 76 || 73 || 36.3 || .460 || .232 || .808 || 11.2 || 3.6 || 1.2 || 1.7 || 20.7
|-
| style="text-align:left;"| 
| style="text-align:left;"|New Jersey
| 77 || 77 || 36.1 || .447 || .314 || .774 || 11.3 || 3.4 || 0.9 || 1.8 || 20.2
|-
| style="text-align:left;"| 
| style="text-align:left;"|New Jersey
| 56 || 54 || 37.6 || .424 || .233 || .767 || 10.6 || 3.3 || 0.6 || 1.7 || 20.5
|-
| style="text-align:left;"| 
| style="text-align:left;"|Philadelphia
| 11 || 11 || 26.7 || .407 || .333 || .625 || 6.5 || 2.8 || 0.4 || 0.9 || 11.2
|-
| style="text-align:left;"| 
| style="text-align:left;"|Philadelphia
| 57 || 54 || 36.9 || .435 || .269 || .745 || 10.1 || 3.4 || 0.9 || 1.3 || 18.1
|-
| style="text-align:left;"| 
| style="text-align:left;"|Philadelphia
| 59 || 58 || 36.2 || .411 || .265 || .772 || 9.9 || 2.5 || 0.8 || 1.2 || 17.6
|-
| style="text-align:left;"| 
| style="text-align:left;"|Charlotte
| 37 || 29 || 31.8 || .414 || .212 || .753 || 8.9 || 2.1 || 0.6 || 1.1 || 13.1
|-
| style="text-align:left;"| 
| style="text-align:left;"|Charlotte
| 74 || 64 || 31.7 || .456 || .362 || .785 || 8.5 || 2.4 || 0.5 || 1.8 || 16.7
|-
| style="text-align:left;"| 
| style="text-align:left;"|Charlotte
| 34 || 3 || 20.1 || .380 || .392 || .685 || 5.4 || 1.1 || 0.3 || 0.6 || 8.1
|-
| style="text-align:left;"| 
| style="text-align:left;"|Philadelphia
| 58 || 58 || 35.9 || .450 || .337 || .815 || 8.8 || 1.7 || 0.7 || 0.9 || 15.1
|-
| style="text-align:left;"| 
| style="text-align:left;"|Philadelphia
| 64 || 35 || 27.2 || .448 || .328 || .784 || 7.0 || 1.4 || 0.8 || 1.1 || 9.4
|-
| style="text-align:left;"| 
| style="text-align:left;"|Philadelphia
| 34 || 30 || 24.8 || .413 || .222 || .754 || 5.6 || 1.4 || 0.7 || 0.8 || 8.0
|-
| style="text-align:left;"| 
| style="text-align:left;"| Detroit 
| 5 || 0 || 10.0 || .214 || .000 || 1.000 || 3.0 || 0.0 || 0.0 || 0.0 || 1.8
|- class="sortbottom"
| style="text-align:center;" colspan="2"| Career
| 781 || 672 || 33.2 || .447 || .295 || .769 || 9.3 || 2.5 || 0.8 || 1.3 || 16.5
|- class="sortbottom"
| style="text-align:center;" colspan="2"| All-Star
| 1 || 1 || 18.0 || .167 || .000 || – || 3.0 || 1.0 || 1.0 || 1.0 || 2.0

Playoffs 

|-
|style="text-align:left;"|1992
|style="text-align:left;"|New Jersey
|4||4||40.5||.486||.167||.762||11.3||5.3||1.8||1.0||22.3
|-
|style="text-align:left;"|1993
|style="text-align:left;"|New Jersey
|5||5||45.0||.532||.417||.806||13.4||4.6||1.2||2.6||26.8
|-
|style="text-align:left;"|1994
|style="text-align:left;"|New Jersey
|4||4||43.3||.397||.556||.780||14.3||2.5||0.5||1.3||24.5
|-
|style="text-align:left;"|2000
|style="text-align:left;"|Charlotte
|4||4||42.3||.474||.313||.786||12.5||3.5||0.8||3.0||20.3
|-
|style="text-align:left;"|2001
|style="text-align:left;"|Charlotte
|5||0||17.6||.265||.250||.778||5.0||1.2||0.8|| 0.4 ||5.4
|-
|style="text-align:left;"|2002
|style="text-align:left;"|Philadelphia
|5||5||38.2||.524||.308||.800||9.2||2.0||0.2||1.4||12.8
|-
|style="text-align:left;"|2003
|style="text-align:left;"|Philadelphia
|12||12||37.4||.500||.400||.872||8.0||2.0||0.6||1.3||13.6
|- class="sortbottom"
| style="text-align:center;" colspan="2"| Career
| 39 || 34 || 37.4 || .472 || .351 || .806 || 9.9 || 2.8 || 0.8 || 1.5 || 16.8

See also
 List of NCAA Division I men's basketball players with 2000 points and 1000 rebounds
 List of NCAA Division I men's basketball career rebounding leaders

Footnotes

References

External links
nba.com/historical/playerfile

1967 births
Living people
African-American basketball players
All-American college men's basketball players
American men's basketball players
Basketball players from Alabama
Basketball players from Detroit
Charlotte Hornets players
Detroit Pistons players
FIBA World Championship-winning players
McDonald's High School All-Americans
National Basketball Association All-Stars
New Jersey Nets draft picks
New Jersey Nets players
People from Franklin Lakes, New Jersey
Philadelphia 76ers players
Power forwards (basketball)
Northern High School (Detroit, Michigan) alumni
Sportspeople from Mobile, Alabama
Syracuse Orange men's basketball players
United States men's national basketball team players
1994 FIBA World Championship players
21st-century African-American people
20th-century African-American sportspeople